David Coulibaly (born 21 January 1978 in Roubaix, France) is a retired footballer. He last played for Entente Sportive de Wasquehal. Born in France, he represented Mali at international level.

International career
He was capped for Mali at the 2002 and 2004 editions of the African Cup of Nations finals.

References

1978 births
Living people
Citizens of Mali through descent
Malian footballers
French footballers
Mali international footballers
Ligue 1 players
Ligue 2 players
Lille OSC players
LB Châteauroux players
Wasquehal Football players
Chamois Niortais F.C. players
Grenoble Foot 38 players
Tours FC players
AC Arlésien players
2002 African Cup of Nations players
2004 African Cup of Nations players
Sportspeople from Roubaix
Association football midfielders
French sportspeople of Malian descent
Footballers from Hauts-de-France